Gyula Gazdag (born 19 July 1947 in Budapest) is a Hungarian film director, screenwriter and actor.

Filmography 
Director
The Long Distance Runner [Hosszú futásodra mindig számíthatunk...] (1969, documentary short)
The Selection [A válogatás] (1970, documentary short)
The Whistling Cobblestone [A sípoló macskakő] (1971)
The Resolution [A határozat] (1972, documentary)
Singing on the Treadmill [Bástyasétány hetvennégy] (1974)
Swap [A kétfenekű dob] (1978)
The Banquet [A bankett] (1982, documentary)
Lost Illusions [Elveszett illúziók] (1983)
Package Tour [Társasutazás] (1985, documentary)
A Hungarian Fairy Tale [Hol volt, hol nem volt...] (1987)
Stand Off [Túsztörténet] (1989)
Hungarian Chronicles [Chroniques hongroises] (1991, documentary)
A Poet on the Lower east Side [Egy költö a Lower East Side-ról] (1997, documentary)

Actor
25, Firemen's Street Tüzoltó utca 25. (1973)
Dreaming Youth [Álmodó ifjúság] (1974)
Confidence Bizalom (1980)
Colonel Redl [Oberst Redl] 1985
Working West (1992)

External links 

1947 births
Hungarian film directors
Hungarian screenwriters
Male screenwriters
Hungarian male writers
Hungarian male film actors
Living people
Writers from Budapest
Male actors from Budapest